Spiceland may refer to:

 Spiceland, Indiana, a town
 Spiceland Township, Indiana